Dangerous Summer may refer to:

A Dangerous Summer, a 1982 Australian film
Dangerous Summer (film), a 2000 Latvian film
The Dangerous Summer, a 1985 nonfiction book by Ernest Hemingway
The Dangerous Summer (band), an American rock band, or a 2018 album by the band